William Wyatt Moore (born c. 1832) was a Florida politician.

Moore was born in Florida and worked as a printer.  Moore, a Republican scalawag, represented Columbia County, Florida in the Florida House of Representatives from 1868 to 1870 and served as Speaker of the Florida House of Representatives for the 1868 session.  In 1873 he was postmaster of Lake City, Florida.

References
 

1832 births
Speakers of the Florida House of Representatives
Florida postmasters
People from Lake City, Florida
Year of death missing